Cnemogonini is a tribe of minute seed weevils in the family of beetles known as Curculionidae. There are 15 genera in Cnemogonini.

Selected genera
 Acanthoscelidius Hustache, 1930 i c g b
 Asperauleutes b
 Auleutes Dietz, 1896 i c g b
 Cnemogonus LeConte, 1876 i c g b
 Craponius LeConte, 1876 i c g b
 Dietzella Champion, 1907 i g b
 Orchestomerus Dietz, 1896 c g b
 Parauleutes Colonnelli, 2004 g b
 Pelenosomus Dietz, 1896 i c g b
 Perigaster Dietz, 1896 i c g b
 Perigasteromimus Colonnelli, 1999 c g b
Data sources: i = ITIS, c = Catalogue of Life, g = GBIF, b = Bugguide.net

References

Further reading

External links

 

Curculionidae